Sea Cliff or Seacliff is an unincorporated community in Ventura County, California, United States. Known as Seacliff Beach Colony, the gated community contains 49 homes. In 1991, the community was evacuated for a week after a train derailment on the rail line between Los Angeles and San Francisco spilled hydrazine in the area. The homeowners reached an agreement in 2005 to purchase the property from the land company, Seacliff Land LLC. They were all previously leasing the land from Seacliff, which owned the property on which their homes were built.

References

Populated coastal places in California
Unincorporated communities in Ventura County, California
Beaches of Ventura County, California
Unincorporated communities in California